The 2004 IBAF Women's Baseball World Cup was held from July 30 to August 8, 2004 in Edmonton, Alberta, Canada and won by the United States. It was the first Women's Baseball World Cup and was sanctioned by the International Baseball Federation.

Competing teams were Australia, Canada, Chinese Taipei (Taiwan), Japan, USA. India and Bulgaria were scheduled to compete, but withdrew before the tournament.

Final results

Results

All-Star team

2004
Women's Baseball World Cup
2000s in women's baseball
2004 in baseball
Women's Baseball World Cup, 2004
July 2004 sports events in Canada
August 2004 sports events in Canada
Sports competitions in Edmonton
2000s in Edmonton
Women's baseball in Canada
Baseball World Cup
Baseball in Edmonton